Dendrosida is a genus of flowering plants belonging to the family Malvaceae.

Its native range is Southern Mexico, Colombia to Venezuela.

Species:

Dendrosida batesii 
Dendrosida breedlovei 
Dendrosida cuatrecasasii 
Dendrosida oxypetala 
Dendrosida parviflora 
Dendrosida sharpiana

References

Malveae
Malvaceae genera